Small Town Deb is a 1941 teenage comedy by 20th Century Fox directed by Harold Schuster and starring Jane Withers and Jane Darwell. Withers had a story credit on the film under the pseudonym Jerrie Walters and costumes were made by Herschel McCoy.

Cast
 Jane Withers as Patricia Randall
 Jane Darwell as Katie
 Bruce Edwards as Jack Richards
 Cobina Wright Jr. as Helen Randall
 Cecil Kellaway as Henry Randall
 Katharine Alexander as Mrs. Randall
 Jackie Searl as Tim Randall
 Buddy Pepper as Chauncey Jones
 Margaret Early as Sue Morgan
 Douglas Wood as Eustace R. Richards
 John T. Murray as Mr. Anthony
 Ruth Gillette as Clerk
 Blossom Rock as Beauty Operator (as Marie Blake)
 Jeff Corey as Hector
 Henry Roquemore as Barber
 Edwin Stanley as Mr. Blakely
 Isabel Randolph as Mrs. Jones
 Nora Lane as Customer
 Dorothy Appleby as Dancer

External links

1941 comedy films
1941 films
1940s teen films
20th Century Fox films
American black-and-white films
American teen comedy films
1940s English-language films
Films directed by Harold D. Schuster
Films scored by Emil Newman
1940s American films